is a 1999 Japanese V-cinema (direct-to-video) horror film written and directed by Daisuke Yamanouchi.

Plot
The film follows a group of four contestants (a husband and wife on the verge of divorce, a young corporate woman, and a 17-year-old schoolgirl) on a reality TV game show who are locked in the titular "Red Room" to torture each other, with the last person standing winning ten million yen.  The contestants are made to pick cards to decide who will pick the torture, who will apply it, and who will be the victim.  The tortures chosen start off relatively mild, but gradually escalate into extreme sadism and sexual abuse.

Cast
 Yuki Tsukamoto
 Mayumi Ōkawa
 Hiroshi Kitasenju
 Sheena Nagamori

Release
The film was originally released in Japan in VHS format on June 4, 1999 and later as a  DVD on December 22, 2005. Red Room was released in the US by Anthem Pictures on January 9, 2007.

In 2000, the film was followed by a sequel, titled Red Room 2.

References

External links

Reception
The movie got mixed to negative reviews.

1999 films
Direct-to-video horror films
1990s Japanese-language films
Japanese horror films
Japanese independent films
Japanese splatter films
1990s exploitation films
1999 horror films
Films about death games
1990s Japanese films